Mikk Jurkatamm (born 18 September 2000) is an Estonian professional basketball player for Treviso Basket of the Lega Basket Serie A (LBA). He also represents the Estonian national team. Standing at 1.96 m (6 ft 5 in), he plays at the shooting guard position.

References

External links
 Mikk Jurkatamm at fiba.com
 Mikk Jurkatamm at basket.ee 

2000 births
Living people
21st-century Estonian people
Estonian expatriate basketball people in Italy
Estonian men's basketball players
Lega Basket Serie A players
Shooting guards
Basketball players from Tallinn
TTÜ KK players
Universo Treviso Basket players
Virtus Bologna players